Randy Rose is a musician who has been playing professionally since 1987, when his older brother Roger formed Mad at the World, for which he played drums, sang, and wrote songs.

History
Randy Rose was a member of Mad at the World during its entire existence as a band from 1987-1998. When Mad at the World was a synthpop band during its first two years, Randy played percussion, worked on the drum programming, and sang backup vocals. Randy continued with drums and vocals as the band transitioned to a hard rock band in early 1990. He also formed his own metal band soon after, named Rose. After his tenure in Mad at the World, Rose went on to make various demos under different names, also forming the band Mothership in 1998. On March 24, 2017, he released a new album for Rose, Songs for the Ritually Abused, on his own label Hindenburg Records.

Discography

with Mad at the World

as Randy Rose

with Rose

with Mood Ring

with The Crocodiles

with Mothership

References

Performers of Christian rock music
Living people
American rock drummers
American performers of Christian music
Year of birth missing (living people)